Sangp'unggang station is a railway station in Unbong-rodongjagu, Chasŏng County, Chagang Province, North Korea, on the Pukbunaeryuk Line of the Korean State Railway; it is also the starting point of the Unbong Line.

History
Although the Unbong Line was opened in 1959, the halt at Sangp'unggang was opened only on 27 November 1987 when construction of the first western section (Sangp'unggang–Chasŏng) of the Pukbunaeryuk Line was completed; as far as this point, the Unbong Line was absorbed into the new Pukpu Line, and Sangp'unggang became the junction point of the Pukpu Line and the truncated remainder of the Unbong Line.

References

Railway stations in North Korea